Harold W. Kopp (January 19, 1909 – May 11, 1998) was an American football coach.  He served as the head football coach at the University of Rhode Island, Brigham Young University (BYU), and Bentley University, compiling a career college football record of 51–39–6.

At Rhode Island, Kopp led the Rams to three Yankee Conference titles in five seasons (two shared, one outright). When they won their first title in 1952, it was the first championship in the Rhode Island football program's history. In 1955, he led them to the program's first bowl game, the Refrigerator Bowl, where the Rams lost, 12–10, to Jacksonville State.

As the coach of the BYU Cougars football team, Kopp produced winning records in his last two seasons, but was dismissed from the university when rumors surfaced that he had committed a potential NCAA rules infraction.  From 1964 to 1970 Kopp was head football coach at Waltham High School. The team went undefeated in 1965.  Kopp was also the first-ever head coach for the Bentley Falcons football program when he took the reins in 1972. He coached there for four seasons.

Kopp was author of a book titled I've Seen It All.

Head coaching record

College

1909 births
1998 deaths
Bentley Falcons football coaches
Boston University Terriers football coaches
Brown Bears football coaches
Harvard Crimson football coaches
McDaniel Green Terror football players
Northeastern Huskies football coaches
Rhode Island Rams football coaches
UConn Huskies football coaches
Yale Bulldogs football coaches
High school football coaches in Massachusetts